The Pygmy is a British breed of dwarf goat. It is small, compact and generally stockily built. It was established in the 1980s by fusion of the various miniature goat populations of the United Kingdom into a single breed. These were of two principal types: a stocky achondroplastic type derived from the West African Dwarf group of breeds of West Africa; and a small but well-proportioned type derived from the Southern Sudan goat.

History 

From the nineteenth century small goats from Africa were brought to the United Kingdom to be exhibited in zoos. Some of these came into the hands of private breeders, who kept and bred them as companion animals. Among these there were two principal types: a broad, short-legged, compact and solid achondroplastic type, often blue roan in colour, derived from the West African Dwarf group of breeds of West Africa; and a small but well-proportioned type derived from the Southern Sudan goat. Regardless of their actual origins, the former was known as the "Cameroon" and the latter as the "Nigerian".

In 1982 the varying types were merged into a single breed. A breed society – the Pygmy Goat Club – was formed, and a herd-book started. The breed society is not among those approved by the Department for Environment, Food and Rural Affairs to operate a herd-book.

In 2018 a population of 2316 head was reported to the DAD-IS breed database of the Food and Agriculture Organization of the United Nations. In 2019 the conservation status of the Pygmy was listed there as "at risk"; it was not on the goat watchlist of the Rare Breeds Survival Trust.

Use 

The Pygmy is reared for show or as a companion animal.

References

Goat breeds
Goat breeds originating in the United Kingdom